The 2008 AFC President's Cup was the fourth edition of the AFC President's Cup, a competition for football clubs in countries categorized as "emerging nations" by the Asian Football Confederation. For this edition, the tournament was extended from eight to eleven teams, with three groups in place of the previous two. The three new teams came from Bangladesh, Myanmar and Turkmenistan. The eleven teams that competed were split up into three groups and played each other team in their group once. The winner of each group and the best runner-up qualified for the semifinals, and the winners of the semifinal matches played in the final match to determine the winner.

Each group was to be played over a period of days in April at one venue - Group A at Dashrath Stadium, Nepal, Group B at Chungshan Stadium, Taiwan and Group C at Sugathadasa Stadium, Sri Lanka. However, due to political unrest in Nepal, Group A matches were postponed and eventually played at MPPJ Stadium, Malaysia in June.

The final stage of the competition was played in Kyrgyzstan from September 19–21.

Venues

Group stage

Final stage

Qualifying teams

1 Mehandra Police Club now known as Nepal Police Club.

2 No league held in 2007–08 so 2006–07 champions qualify.

3 Pakistan Army F.C. were originally Pakistan's entrants, but replaced by WAPDA for rearranged group stage.

Group stage

Group A
All matches played at MPPJ Stadium, Kuala Lumpur

Group B
All matches played at Chungshan Stadium, Taipei

Group C
All matches played at Sugathadasa Stadium, Colombo

Final stage

Semi-finals

Final

OFFICIALS
Linesman: Sokhandan Reza (Iran)
Linesman: Bakhtiyor Tagaev (Uzbekistan)

References

External links
 AFC President's Cup 2008
 RSSSF President's Cup 2008

3
AFC President's Cup
International association football competitions hosted by Kyrgyzstan